The Baldwin 4-8+8-4 750/8DE1 was the Baldwin Locomotive Works' first attempt at building a road diesel locomotive. The trucks were configured in a 2-D+D-2 wheel arrangement. Only a single test unit was built.

In 1943 Baldwin built an experimental "Centipede" as a demonstrator unit, which was assigned road #6000. The uniquely styled unit, with its upright, aggressive prow, was to be powered with eight model 408-series V8 8LV diesel engines (which would have produced ), though only four were actually installed. The locomotive's running gear design reflected Baldwin steam and electric locomotive practice. The carbody rode on two massive articulated cast steel half-frames cast by General Steel Castings, linked at the middle with a hinged joint. Unpowered four-wheel trucks at each end guided the locomotive through curves for stability at speed.

The locomotive utilized unique "power packages", each consisting of an engine, generator, radiator, electrical cabinet, and other auxiliaries. These power packages could be changed out in as little as 20 minutes. While the locomotive was designed to carry 8 of these power packages, only 4 were ever installed. Each engine powered a single axle of the locomotive.

The lone unit was tested on the Pennsylvania Railroad, Baltimore and Ohio, and Reading, but dismantled soon after production, and its running gear was used for the one of a kind prototype #4500 Seaboard Air Line  "Centipede".

References
 
 
 

Diesel-electric locomotives of the United States
2-D+D-2 locomotives
Centipede
Experimental locomotives
Railway locomotives introduced in 1943
Scrapped locomotives
Standard gauge locomotives of the United States